American Milkshake is a 2013 American dark comedy film written, produced, and directed by David Andalman and Mariko Munro, starring Tyler Ross, Shareeka Epps, Georgia Ford, Eshan Bay, Leo Fitzpatrick and Danny Burstein.

Plot
In the mid-1990s, Jolie Jolson, a white high school student (the great-grandson of blackface performer Al Jolson) wants to be on the basketball team because he thinks that it will bring him closer to being the one thing that he isn't: black. His African American girlfriend, Henrietta, is pregnant with another man's baby and had a seedy past which includes appearing in a sex tape. Jolie gets on the basketball team due to a large donation from his well-off father, and ends up dating one of the cheerleaders for the team, and accidentally impregnates her.

Cast
 Tyler Ross as Jolie
 Shareeka Epps as Henrietta
 Georgia Ford as Christine
 Leo Fitzpatrick as Mr. McCarty
 Eshan Bay as Haroon
 Danny Burstein as Coach
 Nuri Hazzard as Arius
 Anna Friedman as Jeanette

Release
The film premiered at the Sundance Film Festival on January 20, 2013 and was sold to Phase 4 Films and the Kevin Smith Movie Club for theatrical and day and date release and it also won the producer's award at US in Progress.

References

External links

2013 films
2010s English-language films
2013 black comedy films
SModcast Pictures films
Films about interracial romance
American black comedy films
Phase 4 Films films
2010s American films